Gharidah Farooqi is a Pakistani television host and anchorperson who belongs to Sabzazar Lahore, Pakistan.

Gharidah has worked with PTV Home, ATV (Pakistan), Dunya TV, Geo News, Samaa TV (in 2012) and is currently (in 2017) a Senior Anchor Person at Express News. Gharidah Farooqi has hosted current affairs TV program "G for Gharidah" (جي فار غريده) since 2015.

In September 2015, Farooqi interviewed Rana Sanaullah Khan, Law Minister in the provincial government of Punjab, Pakistan on her TV show G for Gharida.

In June 2016, on her TV show G for Gharida, Farooqi interviewed Maryam Nawaz on the progress of her father former Prime Minister  Nawaz Sharif after he underwent an open heart surgery.
She took master's degree from Lahore.

Child abuse incident
On 25 July 2017, Lahore police recovered a fifteen year old maid from the home of Farooqi, where she was kept in illegal detention and was tortured. On 23 August 2017, Farooqi reached a settlement with the mother of the maid.

Leaked sextape
On 26 September 2021 sexually explicit videos were posted online that allegedly showed PMLN politician & spokesperson of Maryam Nawaz, Zubair Umar having sex with two women. While one remained unidentified, the other woman was speculated to be Gharida since the woman in the video was also wearing the same pajamas as Gharida did on her live TV show a few days before the leaks.

References

External links
 Watch G for Gharida TV show on YouTube of 8 April 2017
 Watch G for Gharida TV show of 15 July 2017 

1978 births
Living people
Pakistani television talk show hosts
Pakistani women journalists
Pakistani television newsreaders and news presenters
Women television journalists
Sex scandals
Political sex scandals
Violence against children
Child abuse incidents and cases